In enzymology, a lactate 2-monooxygenase is an enzyme that catalyzes the chemical reaction

(S)-lactate + O2  acetate + CO2 + H2O

Thus, the two substrates of this enzyme are (S)-lactate and O2, whereas its 3 products are acetate, CO2, and H2O.

This enzyme belongs to the family of oxidoreductases, specifically those acting on single donors with O2 as oxidant and incorporation of two atoms of oxygen into the substrate (oxygenases). The oxygen incorporated need not be derived from O with incorporation of one atom of oxygen (internal monooxygenases o internal mixed-function oxidases).  The systematic name of this enzyme class is (S)-lactate:oxygen 2-oxidoreductase (decarboxylating). Other names in common use include lactate oxidative decarboxylase, lactate oxidase, lactic oxygenase, lactate oxygenase, lactic oxidase, L-lactate monooxygenase, lactate monooxygenase, and L-lactate-2-monooxygenase.  This enzyme participates in pyruvate metabolism.  It employs one cofactor, FMN.

Structural studies

As of late 2007, only one structure has been solved for this class of enzymes, with the PDB accession code .

References 

 
 

EC 1.13.12
Flavoproteins
Enzymes of known structure